Ewerby and Evedon is a civil Parish in North Kesteven, Lincolnshire, England. It includes the villages of Ewerby and Evedon, the hamlet of Haverholme, and is situated immediately west of Sleaford.
 The population of the civil parish at the 2011 census was 509.

Geography

The northern boundary of the parish follows the course of the Sleaford Navigation, and the old course of the River Slea runs within the parish from west to east, joining the navigation   The extreme western tip of the parish pushes into Sleaford and the eastern side is demarked by a short section of the Navigation, and further by a minor drain continuous with it, the Midfodder dike (a local name for the Roman Car Dyke).

The tapering western tip of the parish is traversed by the Sleaford avoiding line of the railway, and the A17 Sleaford bypass. At the North Eastern corner of the parish the place-names Ferry Lane and Ferry Farm point to the former ferry over the modern Slea Navigation.

The Parish is generally open fields, with some woodland, one of whose names belies their purpose: .

Throughout the parish the bedrock is a Jurassic Sedimentary mudstone, of the Oxford clay formation.  This is covered with Glacial Till from the quaternary ice age.

Settlements
Ewerby  
Ewerby Thorpe  
Evedon  
Haverholme

Other Locations
The site of Haverholme Priory  The Gilbertine house of St Mary, founded in 1139 and dissolved in 1539.
The site of a Heronry in Haverholme Wood  
Ewerby Waithe Common Site of Twelve Drain bridge, A bridge which, surprisingly, is not over the Twelve Drain, which is some yards away
Ewerby Fen The lowest part of the parish, no more than 3M above sea level.
Hallgarth The remains of a moat, or ornamental pond.

References

External links

Civil parishes in Lincolnshire
North Kesteven District